Tim Hampton may refer to:

Tim Hampton (politician), American libertarian
Tim Hampton (musician), member of British rock bank Bromheads Jacket
Tim Hampton (producer) (1948–2013), British film producer
Tim Hampton, trainer of wrestler Kamala